Cattistock Halt railway station was a railway station in the county of Dorset in England. It was served by trains on what is now known as the Heart of Wessex Line.  The station was initially timber but was rebuilt in 1959: the two platforms each with a concrete shelter were standard products of the former Southern Railway concrete factory at Exmouth Junction.

History

Opened on 3 August 1931 by the Great Western Railway, it was placed in the Western Region when the railways were nationalised in 1948. The station closed when local trains were withdrawn following the Beeching Report, taking effect on 3 October 1966.

Accidents and incidents
On 24 October 1882, a passenger train was derailed near Cattistock when a bridge collapsed under it due to a storm. One person was severely injured, several others were also injured.

References

 
 
 
 Station on navigable O.S. map

Disused railway stations in Dorset
Former Great Western Railway stations
Railway stations in Great Britain opened in 1931
Railway stations in Great Britain closed in 1966
Beeching closures in England